Patrice Tirolien (17 March 1946 – 23 November 2019) was a French politician who served in the French National Assembly from 1995–1997 and was also a Member of the European Parliament (MEP) elected in the 2009 European election for the Overseas constituency. He was born in Grand-Bourg, Guadeloupe, and was mayor of his home town.

In the 2009 European elections, he was the PS candidate in the Atlantic Section of the Overseas constituency, and his candidacy was locally supported by all anti-independence parties. The PS won one seat in the constituency with 20.26% of the votes, and since the PS obtained its highest result in the Atlantic Section, Tirolien was elected to the European Parliament.

References
 page on the French National Assembly website

1946 births
2019 deaths
People from Grand-Bourg
Mayors of places in Guadeloupe
Deputies of the 10th National Assembly of the French Fifth Republic
Guadeloupean socialists
Socialist Party (France) MEPs
MEPs for the Overseas Territories of France 2009–2014